Harvey Doolittle Colvin (December 18, 1815 – April 16, 1892) was an American politician. Colvin is best remembered for his stint as mayor of Chicago, Illinois from 1873 to 1875 as a member of the People's Party, a pro-liquor factional offshoot of the Republican Party centered in that city.

Biography

Early years

Harvey Doolittle Colvin was born December 18, 1815, in Herkimer County, New York.

Political career

Immediately prior to serving as Chicago's mayor, Colvin served as the city's treasurer. In the 1873 Chicago mayoral election, he ran against acting mayor Lester L. Bond and won with 60% of the vote. Colvin was sworn as mayor on December 1, 1873. One month after taking office as mayor, Colvin was met with a mass demonstration at City Hall when more than 12,000 unemployed workers marched for jobs and relief.  The crowd dispersed after being promised the city would provide relief when an alderman offered to buy them food throughout the winter if the city would reimburse him.

Colvin's administration repealed a Sunday ban on liquor sales which his predecessor, Joseph Medill and Bond supported. In 1874, Colvin's administration was rocked by allegations of patronage and a scandal in the city treasurer's office. Colvin was mayor at the time of the Chicago Fire of 1874, which occurred on July 14, and his administration had to coordinate the response both to the fire and to an outraged fire insurance industry that blamed the city in the wake of the fire for its negligence in coordination of fire prevention.

When the city council called for elections following the adoption of the Cities and Villages Act of 1872 in 1875, they left the office of mayor off the list of offices for the election. Despite this, Thomas Hoyne ran for the office and was elected. Colvin, however, refused to vacate the office and retained the title and position of mayor despite Hoyne's inauguration, partly due to the support of the city comptroller.

In 1876, a state judge ordered a special election be held later in the year.  Monroe Heath, the Republican candidate beat his two rivals, James J. McGrath of the Democratic Party, and Mark Kimball of Colvin's now discredited People's Party. Heath was sworn in as Colvin's successor on July 24, 1876.

Death and legacy

Colvin died in Jacksonville, Florida on April 16, 1892. His body was buried in Rosehill Cemetery in Chicago.

Footnotes

1815 births
1892 deaths
Burials at Rosehill Cemetery
Mayors of Chicago
19th-century American politicians
People from Herkimer County, New York